Vasna may refer to the following entities in (Western) India :

 Vasna (Borsad), a village of the Borad municipality in Gujarat state
 Vasna State, the former princely state which had its seat in the above town
 the Vasna dam, a nearby barrage on the Sabarmati Riverfront